George John I (German: Georg Johann I.; sometimes called George Hans) (11 April 1543 – 18 April 1592) was the Count of Veldenz from 1544 until 1592.

Life
George John was born in 1543 as the only son of Rupert, Count Palatine of Veldenz. George John's cousin, Wolfgang, Count Palatine of Zweibrücken, was a child when he inherited his title, so George John's father served as Wolgang's regent. In 1543, when Wolfgang reached majority and took on the responsibility of office, he enacted the Marburg Contract, giving Rupert the County of Veldenz. Rupert died the following year, and the one-year-old George John succeeded him.

In 1563 he married Anna of Sweden, the daughter of King Gustav I of Sweden, beginning a long-running connection between the Electorate of the Palatinate and Sweden. In 1553 after the Heidelberg War of Succession which regulated the mutual inheritance of all the lines of the House of Wittelsbach, George John obtained Palatinate-Lützelstein. He attempted to develop his Alsatian territories to be the focus of his state, which led to him building the city of Phalsbourg (Pfalzburg) in 1570 and populating it with Protestant refugees from the Duchy of Lorraine. The project was so grand and unaffordable that in 1583 he was forced to sell the city and half of Palatinate-Lützelstein to Lorraine.

George John died in Lützelstein in 1592 and was buried in the city's church.

Marriage
George John married Anna of Sweden (1545–1610), daughter of King Gustavus I, in 1563 and had the following children:
George Gustavus (1564 – 3 June 1634)
Anne Margaret (28 April 1565 – 2 October 1566)
John Rupert (9 September 1566 – 1 October 1567)
Anne Margaret (17 January 1571 – 1 November 1621) third wife of Reichard, Count Palatine of Simmern-Sponheim
Ursula (24 February 1572 – 5 March 1635), second wife of Louis III, Duke of Württemberg
Joanna Elizabeth (2 October 1573 – 28 July 1601)
John Augustus (26 November 1575 – 18 September 1611)
Louis Philip (24 November 1577 – 24 October 1601)
Maria Anne (9 June 1579 – 10 October 1579)
Catherine Ursula (3 August 1582 – 22 January 1595)
George John (24 June 1586 – 29 September 1654)

Ancestors

See also
 Château de La Petite-Pierre, castle which became his residence in 1566 and which he heavily rebuilt.

Counts Palatine of the Holy Roman Empire
House of Wittelsbach
1543 births
1592 deaths